Misery porn (also called misery literature, misery memoirs and trauma porn) is a literary genre dwelling on trauma, mental and physical abuse, destitution, or other enervating trials suffered by the protagonists or, allegedly, the writer (in the case of memoirs).

While in a broad sense the genre is as at least as old as mass-market fiction (e.g., Les Misérables), the terms misery lit and misery porn are usually applied pejoratively to steamy potboilers, schlock horror, and lurid autobiographical wallows of often dubious authenticity, especially those without a happy ending.

The genre
Works in the genre typically—though not exclusively—begin in the subject's childhood, and very often involve suffering some wrong, physical or sexual abuse, or neglect, perpetrated by an adult authority figure, often a parent.  These tales usually culminate in some sort of emotional catharsis, redemption or escape from the abuse or situation.  They are often written in the first person. It is also sometimes called "pathography."

Helen Forrester was credited with inventing the misery memoir genre with the bestseller Twopence to Cross the Mersey in 1974.
Most critics  trace the beginning of the genre to A Child Called "It", a 1995 memoir by American Dave Pelzer, in which he details the outrageous abuse he claims to have suffered at the hands of his alcoholic mother, and two subsequent books which continue the story.  Pelzer's three books—all recovery narratives dealing with his childhood—created considerable controversy, including doubt as to the veracity of the claims.  While the books spent a combined total of 448 weeks on the New York Times paperback nonfiction bestseller list, Pelzer acknowledges purchasing and reselling many thousands of his own books.

Jung Chang's Wild Swans (1992) and Frank McCourt's Angela's Ashes (1996) are also seen as seminal works establishing the genre.

Popularity
In 2007, misery lit was described as "the book world's biggest boom sector".  Works in the genre comprised 11 of the top 100 bestselling English paperbacks of 2006, selling nearly two million copies between them.  The Waterstone’s chain of British book retailers even instituted a discrete "Painful Lives" section; Borders followed suit with "Real Lives".
At the W H Smith chain, the section is entitled "Tragic Life Stories"; in each case side-stepping the dilemma of whether to categorize the books under Fiction or Non-fiction.

The readership for these books is estimated to be "80% or 90% female".  Roughly 80% of the sales of misery lit books are made not in conventional bookstores but in mass-market outlets such as Asda and Tesco.

Criticism
Some of the genre's authors have said they write in order to come to terms with their traumatic memories, and to help readers do the same. Supporters of the genre state the genre's popularity indicates a growing cultural willingness to directly confront topics—specifically child sexual abuse—that once would have been ignored or swept under the rug.

However, a common criticism of the genre is the suggestion that its appeal lies in prurience and voyeurism.  The Times writer Carol Sarler suggests the popularity of the genre indicates a culture "utterly in thrall to paedophilia".  Other critics locate the genre's popular appeal in its combination of moral outrage and titillation.

Literary hoaxes
"Misery lit" has been proven to be a popular genre for literary hoaxes in which authors claim to reveal painful stories from their past.

One early such hoax was the 1836 book Awful Disclosures of Maria Monk, or, The Hidden Secrets of a Nun's Life in a Convent Exposed, by Maria Monk, which claimed to tell of Monk's abuse in a convent. The book was a fabrication, and, though it contained a variety of factual errors, it became a widely read bestseller for several decades as it capitalized on anti-Catholic sentiment in the United States.

The Holocaust has been the subject of several notable literary hoaxes by authors who either falsely claim to have lived through it, or were in fact Holocaust survivors but falsified their experiences. Such hoaxes include The Painted Bird (1965) by Jerzy Kosinski, Fragments: Memories of a Wartime Childhood (1995) by Binjamin Wilkomirski, Misha: A Mémoire of the Holocaust Years (1997) by Misha Defonseca and Angel at the Fence by Herman Rosenblat (which was planned to be published in 2009, but publication was cancelled).

Other, more recent memoirs, which tell of childhood miseries as a result of parental abuse, drug use, illness and the like, have been exposed as hoaxes, including Go Ask Alice (1971) by Beatrice Sparks, A Rock and a Hard Place: One Boy's Triumphant Story (1993) by "Anthony Godby Johnson", The Heart Is Deceitful Above All Things (2001) by "JT LeRoy", Kathy's Story (2005) by Kathy O'Beirne and Love and Consequences (2008) by Margaret Seltzer.

Some memoirs of suffering have included elements of both truth and fiction. These include I, Rigoberta Menchú (1983) by Rigoberta Menchú (a book that won Menchú the Nobel Peace Prize in 1992), and A Million Little Pieces (2003) by James Frey. The latter was initially marketed as non-fiction, and attracted considerable controversy when it was revealed that significant portions of it were fabricated.

See also
Literary forgery
Fake memoirs
Grief porn
Gallows humor
Grimdark

References

Literary genres